The Chicago Manual of Style (abbreviated in writing as CMOS, TCM, or CMS, or sometimes as Chicago) is a style guide for American English published since 1906 by the University of Chicago Press. Its 17 editions have prescribed writing and citation styles widely used in publishing. It is "one of the most widely used and respected style guides in the United States". The guide specifically focuses on American English and deals with aspects of editorial practice, including grammar and usage, as well as document preparation and formatting. It is available in print as a hardcover book, and by subscription as a searchable website as The Chicago Manual of Style Online. The online version provides some free resources, primarily aimed at teachers, students, and libraries.

Availability and uses
The Chicago Manual of Style is published in hardcover and online. The online edition includes the searchable text of both the 16th and 17th—its most recent—editions with features such as tools for editors, a citation guide summary, and searchable access to a Q&A, where University of Chicago Press editors answer readers' style questions. The Chicago Manual of Style also discusses the parts of a book and the editing process. An annual subscription is required for access to the online content of the Manual. (Access to the Q&A, however, is free, as are various editing tools.)

Many publishers throughout the world adopt "Chicago" as their style. It is used in some social science publications, most North American historical journals, and remains the basis for the Style Guide of the American Anthropological Association, the Style Sheet for the Organization of American Historians, and corporate style guides, including the Apple Style Guide.

The Chicago Manual of Style includes chapters relevant to publishers of books and journals. It is used widely by academic and some trade publishers, as well as editors and authors who are required by those publishers to follow it. Kate L. Turabian's A Manual for Writers of Research Papers, Theses, and Dissertations also reflects Chicago style.

Chicago style offers writers a choice of several different formats. It allows the mixing of formats, provided that the result is clear and consistent. For instance, the 15th edition of The Chicago Manual of Style permits the use of both in-text citation systems and/or footnotes or endnotes, including use of "content notes"; it gives information about in-text citation by page number (such as MLA style) or by year of publication (like APA style); it even provides for variations in styles of footnotes and endnotes, depending on whether the paper includes a full bibliography at the end.

Table of contents (17th ed.) 

 List of Tables
 List of Figures
 Preface
 Acknowledgements
 Part I: The Publishing Process
 1. Books and Manuals
 2. Manuscript Preparation, Manuscript Editing, and Proofreading
 3. Illustrations and Tables
 4. Rights, Permissions, and Copyright Administration by William S. Strong
 Part II: Style and Usage
 5. Grammar and Usage by Bryan A. Garner
 6. Punctuation
 7. Spelling, Distinctive Treatment of Words, and Compounds
 8. Names, Terms, and Titles of Works
 9. Numbers
 10. Abbreviations
 11. Languages Other than English
 12. Mathematics in Type
 13. Quotations and Dialogue
 Part III: Source Citations and Indexes
 14. Notes and Bibliography
 15. Author-Date References
 16. Indexes
 Glossary
 Bibliography
 Index

Citation styles
Two types of citation styles are provided.  In both cases, two parts are needed: first, notation in the text, which indicates that the information immediately preceding was from another source; and second, the full citation, which is placed at another location.

Author-date style
Using author-date style, the sourced text is indicated parenthetically with the last name(s) of the author(s) and the year of publication with no intervening punctuation.

 Research has found that students do not always cite their work properly (Smith 2016).

When page numbers are used, they are placed along with the author's last name and date of publication after an interposed comma. 
    
 Research has found that students do not always cite their work properly (Smith 2016, 24).

If the author's name is used in the text, only the date of publication need be cited parenthetically (with or without the page number).

 Research done by Smith found that students do not always cite their work properly (2016).

In-text citations are usually placed just inside a mark of punctuation. An exception to this rule is for block quotations, where the citation is placed outside the punctuation.

The full citation for the source is then included in a references section at the end of the material. As publication dates are prominent in this style, the reference entry places the publication date following the author(s) name.

Heilman, James M., and Andrew G. West. 2015. "Wikipedia and Medicine: Quantifying Readership, Editors, and the Significance of Natural Language." Journal of Medical Internet Research 17 (3): e62. doi:10.2196/jmir.4069.

Notes and bibliography style

Using notes and bibliography style, the sourced text is indicated by a superscripted note number that corresponds to a full citation either at the bottom of the page (as a footnote) or at the end of a main body of text (as an endnote). In both instances, the citation is also placed in a bibliography entry at the end of the material, listed in alphabetical order of the author's last name. The two formats differ: notes use commas where bibliography entries use periods.

The following is an example of a journal article citation provided as a note and its bibliography entry. The third example of the bibliography entry is marked up with color to identify its parts.

  1. James M. Heilman and Andrew G. West, "Wikipedia and Medicine: Quantifying Readership, Editors, and the Significance of Natural Language," Journal of Medical Internet Research 17, no. 3 (2015): e62, doi:10.2196/jmir.4069.

  Heilman, James M., and Andrew G. West. "Wikipedia and Medicine: Quantifying Readership, Editors, and the Significance of Natural Language." Journal of Medical Internet Research 17, no. 3 (2015): e62. doi:10.2196/jmir.4069.

Heilman, James M., and Andrew G. West
"Wikipedia and Medicine: Quantifying Readership, Editors, and the Significance of Natural Language."
Journal of Medical Internet Research
17
no. 3
(2015)
e62
doi:10.2196/jmir.4069
 Author(s) first listed author's name inverted in the bibliography entry
 Article title inside quotation marks
 Journal title in italic type
 Volume
 Issue
 Year along with month, if specified
 Page numbers specific page number in a note; page range in a bibliography entry
 Digital object identifier

History
What now is known as The Chicago Manual of Style was first published in 1906 under the title Manual of Style: Being a compilation of the typographical rules in force at the University of Chicago Press, to which are appended specimens of type in use. From its first 203-page edition, the CMOS evolved into a comprehensive reference style guide of 1,146 pages in its 17th edition. It was one of the first editorial style guides published in the United States, and it is largely responsible for research methodology standardization, notably citation style.

The most significant revision to the manual was made for the 12th edition, published in 1969. Its first printing of 20,000 copies sold out before it was printed. In 1982, with the publication of the 13th edition, it was officially retitled The Chicago Manual of Style, adopting the informal name already in widespread use.

More recently, the publishers have released a new edition about every seven to ten years. The 15th edition (2003) was revised to reflect the emergence of computer technology and the internet in publishing, offering guidance for citing electronic works. Other changes include a chapter on American English grammar and use, and a revised treatment of mathematical copy.

In August 2010, the 16th edition was published simultaneously in the hardcover and online editions for the first time in the Manuals history. In a departure from the earlier red-orange cover, the 16th edition features a robin's-egg blue dust jacket (a nod to older editions with blue jackets, such as the 11th and 12th). The 16th edition featured "music, foreign languages, and computer topics (such as Unicode characters and URLs)". It also expands recommendations for producing electronic publications, including web-based content and e-books. An updated appendix on production and digital technology demystified the process of electronic workflow and offered a primer on the use of XML markup. It also includes a revised glossary, including a host of terms associated with electronic and print publishing. The Chicago system of documentation is streamlined to achieve greater consistency between the author-date and notes-bibliography systems of citation, making both systems easier to use. In addition, updated and expanded examples address the many questions that arise when documenting online and digital sources, from the use of DOIs to citing social networking sites. Figures and tables are updated throughout the book, including a return to the Manuals popular hyphenation table and new, selective listings of Unicode numbers for special characters.

In 2013, an adapted Spanish version was published by the University of Deusto in Bilbao, Spain.

In April 2016, the publisher released The Chicago Guide to Grammar, Usage, and Punctuation, Bryan A. Garner's expansion of his Chicago Manual of Style chapter on the topic, and coinciding with the release of the new edition of Garner's Modern American Usage.

The 17th edition was published in September 2017. It offers new and expanded style guidelines in response to advancing technology and social change. It also includes new and revised content reflecting the latest publishing practices and electronic workflows and self-publishing. Citation recommendations, the glossary of problematic words and phrases, and the bibliography have all been updated and expanded. In the 17th edition, email lost its hyphen, internet became lowercase, the singular "they" and "their" are now acceptable in certain circumstances, a major new section on syntax has been added, and the long-standing recommendation to use "ibid" has changed due to electronic publishing.

Recent printed editions

See also
 Linguistic prescription
 A Manual for Writers of Research Papers, Theses, and Dissertations
 Oxford Standard for Citation of Legal Authorities

Explanatory notes

References

External links

 
 Chicago Manual of Style 17th Edition at Purdue Online Writing Lab (OWL)

Chicago Manual of Style, The
Academic style guides
Chicago Manual of Style, The
Chicago Manual of Style, The